Annino is a Moscow Metro station in the Chertanovo Yuzhnoye District, Southern Administrative Okrug, Moscow. It is on the Serpukhovsko-Timiryazevskaya Line, between Ulitsa Akademika Yangelya and Bulvar Dmitriya Donskogo stations.

Annino was opened on 12 December 2001.

Architecture 
The station has two vestibules. The north vestibule goes to Varshavskoye Shosse. The south was opened on 15 June 2012.

References

External links 

 Annino station on official website of Moscow Metro
 Metro.ru

Moscow Metro stations
Serpukhovsko-Timiryazevskaya Line
Railway stations located underground in Russia